Partsazan Khorasan was an Iranian football club based in Mashhad, Khorasan. The team is sponsored and owned by Partsazan Investment Group.

History

Chairman

Head coaches
 Asif Namazov Jun 2001–2002
 Mohammad Hassan Ansarifar

Famous players

Defunct football clubs in Iran
Sport in Mashhad